At Last There Is Nothing Left To Say is a collection of short stories, fiction, essays, and rants by Canadian musician Matthew Good.  It was released in 2001 by Insomniac Press, and contains all "manifestos" posted on the band's web site from 1997 through 2000.

References

Canadian short story collections
2001 short story collections